TED may refer to:

Economics and finance
 TED spread between U.S. Treasuries and Eurodollar

Education
 Türk Eğitim Derneği, the Turkish Education Association
 TED Ankara College Foundation Schools, Turkey
 Transvaal Education Department (TED)

Entertainment and media
 TED (conference) (Technology, Entertainment, and Design)
 Tenders Electronic Daily, a journal on government procurement in the European Union
 Turner Field (The Ted), of the Atlanta Braves until 2017

Technology and computing
 MOS Technology TED, an integrated circuit
 TED Notepad, a freeware portable plain-text editor
 Television Electronic Disc, an early Telefunken video disc
 Transferred electron device or Gunn diode
 TransLattice Elastic Database, a NewSQL database

Transport
 Teddington railway station, London, National Rail station code

Other uses
 Thyroid eye disease, aka Graves' ophthalmopathy
 Tooheys Extra Dry, Australian beer
 Turtle excluder device, for letting sea turtles escape from fishing-nets

See also
 Ted (disambiguation)
 Teds (disambiguation)
 Tender notification